Monte Davidoff (born 1956) is an American computer programmer.

Davidoff is from Glendale, Wisconsin. He graduated from Nicolet High School in 1974, and went on to Harvard College, where he majored in applied mathematics, the department at Harvard that, at the time, included computer science. Davidoff also worked at WHRB, the college radio station, and graduated from Harvard in 1978.

A college dormmate of Bill Gates who had a summer job at Gates's new company Microsoft during college, Davidoff is best known for writing the Microsoft Binary Format floating-point arithmetic routines for Altair BASIC while he was at Harvard. The routines were subsequently reused in Microsoft BASIC products for other systems. He later worked at Honeywell Information Systems on the Multics project, Tandem Computers, Ready Systems, and Stratus Computer. Since 2000 he has consulted through his own company, Alluvial Software.

See also
Microsoft Binary Format

References

External links
Alluvial Software
2001 Interview with Davidoff in The Register
2022 Interview with Davidoff in the Floppy Days Vintage Computing Podcast

1956 births
Living people
People from Glendale, Wisconsin
American computer programmers
Harvard College alumni
Multics people